The 1923 Northwestern Purple football team represented Northwestern University during the 1923 Big Ten Conference football season. In their second year under head coach Glenn Thistlethwaite, the Purple compiled a 2–6 record (0–6 against Big Ten Conference opponents) and finished in last place in the Big Ten Conference.

Schedule

References

Northwestern
Northwestern Wildcats football seasons
Northwestern Purple football